Eirik Kvalfoss (born 25 December 1959) is a Norwegian retired biathlete.

Life and career
He won three medals during the 1984 Winter Olympics in Sarajevo: gold in the 10 km sprint, silver in relay and bronze in the 20 km individual. In total Kvalfoss won 11 individual Olympic and World Championship medals between 1982–1991, as well as several relay medals. He was awarded Morgenbladets Gullmedalje in 1983.

Kvalfoss did his higher education at the Norwegian School of Sport Sciences.

Biathlon results
All results are sourced from the International Biathlon Union.

Olympic Games
3 medals (1 gold, 1 silver, 1 bronze)

World Championships
13 medals (3 gold, 5 silver, 5 bronze)

*During Olympic seasons competitions are only held for those events not included in the Olympic program.
**Team was added as an event in 1989.

Individual victories
14 victories (4 In, 10 Sp)

*Results are from UIPMB and IBU races which include the Biathlon World Cup, Biathlon World Championships and the Winter Olympic Games.

References

External links
 
 

1959 births
Living people
People from Voss
Norwegian School of Sport Sciences alumni
Norwegian male biathletes
Biathletes at the 1984 Winter Olympics
Biathletes at the 1988 Winter Olympics
Biathletes at the 1992 Winter Olympics
Olympic biathletes of Norway
Medalists at the 1984 Winter Olympics
Olympic medalists in biathlon
Olympic bronze medalists for Norway
Olympic silver medalists for Norway
Olympic gold medalists for Norway
Biathlon World Championships medalists
Holmenkollen Ski Festival winners
Sportspeople from Vestland